Helicogloea is a genus of fungi in the family Phleogenaceae. Basidiocarps (fruit bodies) are gelatinous, effused or pustular, and (microscopically) have unclamped hyphae and basidia that are auricularioid (tubular and laterally septate). Some species form asexual anamorphs producing conidia. The widespread genus contains more than 20 species.

Species
Helicogloea augustispora
Helicogloea aquilonia
Helicogloea aurea
Helicogloea burdsallii
Helicogloea caroliniana
Helicogloea compressa
Helicogloea crassitexta
Helicogloea dryina
Helicogloea eburnea
Helicogloea exigua
Helicogloea globosa
Helicogloea inconspicua
Helicogloea incrustans
Helicogloea intermedia
Helicogloea lagerheimii
Helicogloea lunula
Helicogloea microsaccata
Helicogloea ovispora
Helicogloea pellucida
Helicogloea sebacea
Helicogloea septifera
Helicogloea sputum
Helicogloea subardosiaca
Helicogloea terminalis
Helicogloea variabilis

References

Basidiomycota genera
Atractiellales
Taxa named by Narcisse Théophile Patouillard